Qiemo Yudu Airport  is an airport that serves Qiemo Town in Xinjiang Uyghur Autonomous Region, China. It replaced another airport serving the town, which has a shorter runway, on 19 December 2016. China Southern Airlines offers flights to Ürümqi via Korla.

History
In January 2011, civil aviation officials in Xinjiang announced plans to build a new airport for Qiemo Town, part of a wider scheme to invest in airport construction in the region between 2011 and 2015. Qiemo County officials stated in March 2013 that construction would begin in June. Qiemo Yudu Airport was built in two years at a cost of ¥588million.

China Southern Airlines operated a test flight to the airport on 26 August 2016. It opened on 19 December 2016; China Southern commenced flights to Ürümqi via Korla five times a week. The flights mark the resumption of commercial air service to Qiemo Town, which ended at the old airport in 2011. China Daily reported in December 2016 that China Southern will receive annual government subsidies of about ¥7million for operating the flights.

Infrastructure
Qiemo Yudu Airport has a  terminal that can handle 120,000 passengers per year. The airport can also process  of cargo annually. The runway has dimensions .

Airlines and destinations

References

External links
 Images of the inaugural passenger flight, 19 December 2016 Xinhua News Agency

2016 establishments in China
Airports established in 2016
Airports in Xinjiang